Defense of the Marshall Islands is the responsibility of the United States, but local police matters are handled by the Marshall Islands Police, the national police force, as well as several atoll or municipality-based departments. There are two police forces which function under the name Kwajalein Police, a municipal department known otherwise as Kalgov Police, in addition to law enforcement on the U.S. military base on Kwajalein Atoll separate from the Government of the Marshall Islands, which is handled by the Department of the Army Civilian Police from the United States. Previously, the law enforcement activity on the U.S. military installation was the responsibility of government contractor Alutiiq, LLC, which operated as “Kwajalein Police Department”, a government-owned, contractor operated entity. This operation transitioned to federal employees instead of the use of contractor-provided police officers under the administration of President Barack Obama, who directed federal agencies to review whether certain types of work should be reserved for federal employees as inherently governmental functions. While the law enforcement role on Kwajalein has transitioned to Department of the Army civilian police officers, who are federal employees, Alutiiq still remains on Kwajalein, as the “Security and Access Control Contractor”, providing security guard patrols, Customs/TSA services, marine patrol, and explosives/narcotics detection canines.

The Marshall Islands has provided police officers to the Regional Assistance Mission to Solomon Islands since May 2006.

According to The U.S. Department of State, "After gaining military control of the Marshall Islands from Japan in 1944, the United States assumed administrative control of the Marshall Islands under United Nations auspices as part of the Trust Territory of the Pacific Islands following the end of World War II."

Marshall Islands police officer Clemson Jormelu is contingent commander of the Marshall Islands Police serving as part of RAMSI's Participating Police Force (PPF).

References

External links
http://www.lawenforcementjobs.com/content.cfm?ESID=zoom&JobID=168439
http://www.spc.int/prism/country/mh/stats/Social/Crime/offses.htm
https://web.archive.org/web/20070928014045/http://www.ramsi.org/node/23
http://www.isiservicescorp.com/mjcpatch.html

 
Politics of the Marshall Islands
Law of the Marshall Islands